A hemihelix is a curved geometric shape consisting of a series of helices with alternating chirality, connected by a perversion at the reversals.

The formation of hemihelices with periodic distributions of perversions in slender structures is understood in terms of competing buckling instabilities generated by in-plane stresses.

References 

Helices
Geometric shapes
Curves
Articles containing video clips